Haarhoff is a surname. Notable people with the surname include:

Dorian Haarhoff (born 1944), South African-Namibian writer and poet
Jimmy Haarhoff (born 1981), Zambian footballer
Pierre Haarhoff (born 1932), French sprinter

Afrikaans-language surnames